Kim Dong-kil (born May 19, 1963 in Damyang, Jeollanam-do, South Korea) is a former South Korean amateur boxer.

Career

Kim started garnering attention in May 1982 when he won the light welterweight silver medal at the World Amateur Boxing Championship held in Munich, West Germany. In July 1982, he won the gold medal at the Asian Amateur Boxing Championships with an RSC-2 win over future Olympic silver medalist Dhawee Umponmaha in the final.

Due to the Soviet bloc boycott of the 1984 Los Angeles Olympics, Kim was considered one of the top gold medal favourites in the light welterweight boxing tournament of the Olympics. In the tourney, he easily advanced to the quarterfinals and went on to face Jerry Page of United States. He lost the bout in a 4-1 decision.

He didn't turn pro, and retired after winning his second Asian Games gold medal in the 1986 Asian Games.

Post career

After retirement, Kim earned a master's degree at Korea National Sport University. He is currently a member of the Korean Teachers & Education Workers' Union, serving as a junior high school teacher in Gwangju.

Results

References

External links

Living people
Boxers at the 1984 Summer Olympics
Olympic boxers of South Korea
Asian Games medalists in boxing
1963 births
Boxers at the 1986 Asian Games
Boxers at the 1982 Asian Games
South Korean male boxers
AIBA World Boxing Championships medalists
Asian Games gold medalists for South Korea
Medalists at the 1982 Asian Games
Medalists at the 1986 Asian Games
Welterweight boxers
People from Damyang County